George J. Prokopiou (born 1946) is a billionaire Greek shipowner, founder of Dynacom Tankers, Sea Traders and Dynagas.

Early life
George J. Prokopiou was born in Athens in 1946. He was educated at the National Technical University of Athens.

Career
Prokopiou bought his first ship in 1971, a 55,000-tonne tanker, Pennsylvania. He is the founder of Dynacom Tankers, Sea Traders and Dynagas. In June 2014, the Dynacom Tankers fleet encompassed 54 vessels, the Sea Traders company had a fleet of 29 dry bulk carriers and Dynagas had a fleet of 10 LNG carriers, including four new buildings.

In March 2015, he had a net worth of $2 billion, and a fleet of 89 ships, according to Bloomberg.

In 2016, Lloyd's List named him number 12 in their list of the Top 100 most influential people in the shipping industry. Prokopiou also appeared in the Top 100 in 2012, 2013, 2014 and 2015.

Personal life
He is married to Alexandra. They have four daughters. As of 2014, Eliza, the eldest works for her father's companies, as does her husband Nick Chrissakis. Ioanna works for her father in dry cargo, and her husband, John Kairis also works in shipping, running Kairis Brothers. Marina works on tanker projects and long-term business, and her husband Tony Lauritzen is CEO of Dynagas LNG Partners. The youngest, Maria-Elena, was studying economics at Bocconi University in Milan in 2014.

External links
Official company websites:
 Dynacom Tankers
 Sea Traders
 Dynagas

References

1946 births
Living people
Greek billionaires
Greek businesspeople in shipping
National Technical University of Athens alumni
Businesspeople from Athens